Cryptocoryne is a genus of aquatic plants from the family Araceae. The genus is naturally distributed in tropical regions of India, Southeast Asia and New Guinea.

The typical habitats of Cryptocoryne are mostly streams and rivers with not too rapidly flowing water, in the lowland forest. They also live in seasonally inundated forest pools or on river banks submerged only at high water. Although the proper scientific name of the genus is Cryptocoryne, they are commonly referred to as crypts. The English name "water trumpet" refers to their inflorescence, a spadix enclosed by a spathe (typical for the whole family), which resembles a trumpet.

The first Cryptocoryne species was described in 1779 as Arum spirale by Retzius. The genus was described by Friedrich Ernst Ludwig von Fischer in 1828. However, the scientific classification of Cryptocoryne species is very complicated and there are different opinions about it. Lagenandra is another genus closely related to the genus Cryptocoryne. The two can be easily told apart since the leaves of Cryptocoryne species exhibit convolute vernation whereas Lagenandra species exhibit involute vernation.

The name Cryptocoryne is derived from the Greek crypto, hidden, and koryne, meaning club. The common name (water trumpet) refers to the shape of its inflorescence, which is typical of the Araceae family.

Cultivation and uses 

Some Cryptocoryne are popular commercially cultivated aquarium plants. Submerged plants reproduce vegetatively, emerse plants may flower and reproduce sexually. Many species are cultivated only by dedicated experts and are very hard to grow, or are not present in a culture at all. Some species are endangered because their natural habitats are disappearing. On the other hand, some water trumpets (e.g. Cryptocoryne beckettii) are very hardy aquarium plants, easy to grow to the point that they have become an invasive species after being introduced in Florida in North America. 

Cryptocoryne is either found in peat bogs or on limestone; the latter do well in most aquaria, the former must have soft water to survive and need decomposing beech leaf litter to do well. C. striolata, while found primarily in peat bogs, has also been found growing on limestone. Borneo is home to many endemic crypts previously thought to grow only in tea-colored soft acid water emulating peat bogs but exploration of habitats from 2005 to 2010 showed about half grew on limestone as well. These hardwater Cryptocorynes are generally the easier ones to keep (in fact, some species, such as Cryptocoryne wendtii are said to be among the most versatile of aquarium plants); they tolerate low or bright light but grow faster in more intense light. This water plant's range is around 12 to 33 °C, and slightly alkaline to neutral pH.

Plants of the genus Cryptocoryne, which range from India to New Guinea are found in very diverse conditions. Some are true acid loving plants such as C. pallidnerva, found in peat bogs in Borneo, while others such as C. crispatula var. balansae and C. pontiderifolia are found in streams with limestone beds—hard alkaline water. One species, C. ciliata is even found in semi-brackish water in some areas. It is one of the few aquarium plants that tolerates salt concentrations.

Cryptocoryne plants have been in cultivation in the aquarium hobby since the late 18th century, although it was not until the 1960s that more than a handful of species was known and became more common in the hobby. New species still regularly crop up as interest in these plants widens and more collecting expeditions by private parties are carried out.

Crypt melt 

A phenomenon often encountered when planting new crypts in an aquarium is commonly called Crypt melt, whereby the plant loses all its leaves. There seem to be two possible causes for this.

Rapid environmental change is thought to trigger this, as these plants do not seem to adapt well to transplantion, and may need 30 days or so to become established and for the leaves to regrow. Experienced growers report that it is better to plant crypts in aquariums that have been established for at least three months.

In the wild, crypts can grow fully submerged underwater, but in some plant nurseries they are often grown emersed and crypt melt could then be triggered by the change from emerse to submerse conditions.

There is lately a trend for such nurseries to send crypts as just a rootstock (i.e. without the leaves) to reduce shipping costs and because the leaves will be lost anyway once planted in an aquarium.

Other reports emphasise the need to change the aquarium water regularly to prevent the buildup of nitrates which are thought to trigger this condition (often referred to as a disease).

Species 

 Cryptocoryne affinis N.E.Br. in J.D.Hooker - Thailand, Malaysia
 Cryptocoryne alba de Wit - Sri Lanka
 Cryptocoryne albida R.Parker - southern China, eastern India, Bangladesh, Indochina
 Cryptocoryne annamica Serebryanyi - Vietnam
 Cryptocoryne aponogetifolia Merr. - Philippines
 Cryptocoryne aura  - West kalimantan
 Cryptocoryne auriculata Engl. - Sarawak, Philippines
 Cryptocoryne bangkaensis Bastm. - Sumatra
 Cryptocoryne beckettii Thuill. ex Trim. - Sri Lanka; naturalized in Texas
 Cryptocoryne bogneri Rataj - Sri Lanka
 Cryptocoryne bullosa Becc. - Sarawak
 Cryptocoryne ciliata (Roxb.) Schott - India, Bangladesh, Indochina, Malaysia, Indonesia, New Guinea, Philippines
 Cryptocoryne cognata Schott - India
 Cryptocoryne consobrina Schott - India
 Cryptocoryne cordata var. brunneus Yosuke Kobayashi. - Central Kalimantan, South Kalimantan
 Cryptocoryne cordata var. cordata Griff. - Malaysia
 Cryptocoryne cordata var. siamensis Griff. - Thai
 Cryptocoryne cordata var. diderici Griff. - Sumatra
 Cryptocoryne cordata var. natunensis Yosuke Kobayashi. - Natuna Island
 Cryptocoryne cordata var. grandis Ridl. - Northeast Borneo
 Cryptocoryne cordata var. grabowskii Engl. - South Kalimantan
 Cryptocoryne cordata var. zonata de Wit. - Sri Aman
 Cryptocoryne coronata Bastm. & Wijng. - Philippines
 Cryptocoryne crispatula var. crispatula Engl. - Southeast Asia
 Cryptocoryne crispatula var. alba Yosuke Kobayashi. - Thai, Laos
 Cryptocoryne cruddasiana Prain - Myanmar
 Cryptocoryne decus-silvae de Wit - Johor
 Cryptocoryne dewitii N.Jacobsen - Papua New Guinea
 Cryptocoryne diabolicus Yosuke Kobayashi. - West Kalimantan, Indonesia
 Cryptocoryne purpurea nothovar. edithiae de Wit  - South Kalimantan
 Cryptocoryne elliptica N.E.Br. - Malaysia
 Cryptocoryne ferruginea Engl. - Sarawak
 Cryptocoryne fusca de Wit - Borneo
 Cryptocoryne griffithii Schott - Kalimantan, Peninsular Malaysia
 Cryptocoryne hudoroi Bogner & N.Jacobsen - Kalimantan
 Cryptocoryne huluensis Yosuke Kobayashi - West Kalimantan
 Cryptocoryne ideii Budianto - Kalimantan
 Cryptocoryne jacobsenii de Wit - Sumatra
 Cryptocoryne joshanii Naive & Villanueva - Philippines
 Cryptocoryne keei N.Jacobsen - Sarawak
 Cryptocoryne lingua Becc. ex Engl - Sarawak
 Cryptocoryne loeiensis  Bastm., T.Idei & N.Jacobsen - Laos, Thailand
 Cryptocoryne longicaudaBecc. ex Engl. - Borneo, Malaysia, Sumatra
 Cryptocoryne mekongensis T.Idei, Bastm. & N.Jacobsen - Cambodia, Laos, Thailand
 Cryptocoryne minima Ridl. - Malaysia, Sumatra
 Cryptocoryne moehlmannii de Wit - Sumatra
 Cryptocoryne nevillii Trimen - Sri Lanka
 Cryptocoryne noritoi Wongso - Kalimantan
 Cryptocoryne nurii var. nurii Furtado - Peninsular Malaysia
 Cryptocoryne nurii var. raubensis N.Jacobsen - Peninsular Malaysia
 Cryptocoryne nurii var. tamannegaraensis Yosuke Kobayashi - Peninsular Malaysia
 Cryptocoryne ochiaii Yosuke Kobayashi - Peninsular Malaysia
 Cryptocoryne pallidinervia Engl. - Borneo
 Cryptocoryne parva de Wit- Sri Lanka
 Cryptocoryne pontederiifolia Schott - Sumatra
 Cryptocoryne purpurea nothovar. purpurea Ridl. - Peninsular Malaysia
 Cryptocoryne purpurea nothovar. sarawakensis Yosuke Kobayashi - sarawak
 Cryptocoryne purpurea nothovar. borneoensis  N.Jacobsen , Bastm. - Central Kalimantan
 Cryptocoryne pygmaea Merr. - Philippines
 Cryptocoryne retrospiralis  (Roxb.) Kunth - Bangladesh, India, Myanmar
 Cryptocoryne renifolius Yosuke Kobayashi. - West Kalimantan, Indonesia
 Cryptocoryne kobayashii Yosuke Kobayashi. - West Kalimantan, Indonesia
 Cryptocoryne schulzei de Wit - Johor
 Cryptocoryne scurrilis de Wit - Sumatra
 Cryptocoryne sivadasanii Bogner - southern India
 Cryptocoryne spiralis (Retz.) Fisch. ex Wydler - Bangladesh, India
 Cryptocoryne striolata Engl. - Borneo
 Cryptocoryne thwaitesii Schott - Sri Lanka
 Cryptocoryne timahensis Bastm. - Singapore   (C. cordata × C. nurii)
 Cryptocoryne uenoi Yuji Sasaki - Sarawak
 Cryptocoryne undulata Wendt - Sri Lanka
 Cryptocoryne usteriana Engl.  - Philippines
 Cryptocoryne versteegii Engl. - New Guinea
 Cryptocoryne vietnamensis I.Hertel & H.Mühlberg - Vietnam
 Cryptocoryne villosa N.Jacobsen - Sumatra
 Cryptocoryne walkeri Schott - Sri Lanka
 Cryptocoryne wendtii de Wit - Sri Lanka
 Cryptocoryne × willisii Reitz - Sri Lanka   (C. parva × C. walkeri)
 Cryptocoryne yujii Bastm. - Sarawak
 Cryptocoryne zaidiana Ipor & Tawan - Sarawak
 Cryptocoryne zukalii Rataj - Peninsular Malaysia

References

External links 

 
Araceae genera
Aquarium plants